The Church of St Mary Magdalen is a Roman Catholic church in Ipswich dedicated to Jesus' companion Mary Magdalene. It was founded in 1956 and is part of the Roman Catholic Diocese of East Anglia.  It was originally a part of the parish of Saint Pancras.

References

Saint Mary Magdalen
Roman Catholic churches completed in 1956
20th-century Roman Catholic church buildings in the United Kingdom